Gerlind Cornell Borchers (16 March 1925 – 12 May 2014) was a Lithuanian-German actress and singer, active in the late 1940s and 1950s. She is best remembered for her roles opposite Montgomery Clift in The Big Lift (1950) and Errol Flynn and Nat King Cole in Istanbul (1957). She was said to resemble Ingrid Bergman in mid-1950s reviews.

Biography
Borchers was born in Šilutė (German: Heydekrug), Klaipėda Region (German: Memelland), Lithuania in a German either Prussian Lithuanian or Memellander family. She appeared on the cover of East German magazine Neue Film Welt of 1949, Volume 3, Issue 4. She won a BAFTA Film Award in the category of Best Foreign Actress in 1955 for the movie The Divided Heart (1954). She retired from acting to raise her children.

She was married twice, first to Bruce Cunningham and then to Dr. Anton Schelkopf, a psychologist, physician and film producer, whom she first met when she starred in his films School for Marriage (1954) and Rot ist die Liebe (1957), by whom she had one daughter, Julia Borchers-Schelkopf, born in Munich, on 15 October 1962. She afterwards lived in Bavaria, Germany and died there in 2014.

Filmography
Anonymous Letters (1949) .... Cornelia
Martina (1949) .... Irene
Unknown Sender (1950) .... Dr. Elisabeth Markert
 (1950) .... Maria Mertens
The Big Lift (1950) .... Frederica Burkhardt (also performer: "Vielleicht" and "In einem kleinen Café in Hernals")
The Lie (1950) .... Ellen
Die Tödlichen Träume (1951) .... Angelika / Inez / Lisette / Maria
 Immortal Light (1951) .... Michèle Printemps
Das Ewige Spiel (1951) .... Marie Campenhausen
Dark Eyes (1951) .... Helene Samboni
Adventure in Vienna (1952) .... Karin Manelli
House of Life (1952) .... Dr. Elisabeth Keller
School for Marriage (1954) .... Regine
Maxie (1954) .... Nora
The Divided Heart (1954) .... Inga
Oasis (1955) .... Karine Salstroem
The Dark Wave (1956) .... Herself
Never Say Goodbye (1956) .... Lisa Gosting (also performer: "For the First Time")
Rot ist die Liebe (1957) .... Rosemarie
Istanbul (1957) .... Stephanie Bauer / Karen Fielding
Flood Tide (1958) .... Anne Gordon
Arzt ohne Gewissen (1959) .... Harriet Owen (final film role)

References

External links
 
 Virtual History

1925 births
2014 deaths
20th-century German actresses
20th-century Lithuanian actresses
Best Foreign Actress BAFTA Award winners
German film actresses
German people of Lithuanian descent
Lithuanian film actresses
Lithuanian people of German descent
Naturalized citizens of Germany